The Trang Dai massacre in Tacoma, Washington, occurred on July 5, 1998, when four gunmen entered the Trang Dai Cafe and opened fire, killing five customers and wounding five others. Detectives blamed the violence on warring Asian gangs.

Incident 
Just after 1:30 a.m. on July 5, 1998, three masked gunmen burst into the Trang Dai Cafe and opened fire in the karaoke bar, killing four men and wounding five others. Two other gunmen kept watch out back and killed a waitress as she tried to leave. In all, 41 shots were fired.
The five killed were: Nhan Ai Nguyen, 26; Duy Le, 25; his brother, 27-year-old Hai Le; Tuong Hung Do, 33; and waitress Tuyen Vo, 21. Five were injured and eventually recovered from those injuries. Prosecutors claimed the suspects were targeting a patron, who was injured, because of a personal gripe. The crime remains one of Tacoma's worst mass slayings. Crime is believed to have started from numerous theft events in the community that lead to the Trang Dai Massacre.

Investigation 
On July 18, 1998, Tacoma police officers conducted a large police operation in which they searched nine homes while looking for eight suspects in the case. Four were arrested during the operation. A fifth was arrested the next day on July 19.

An AK-47 found at one of the suspects’ homes was traced back to Bull's Eye Shooter Supply, the same gun shop that was the source of the weapon used in the Beltway sniper attacks.

The suspected ringleader, 22-year-old Ri Le, killed his younger half-brother, 17-year-old Khanh Trinh (one of the gunmen stationed at the back of the cafe), then himself in a murder-suicide pact as police officers closed in. Another suspect, 18-year-old Samath Mom, committed suicide in jail just a few hours after his arrest. The other five – Jimmie Chea, Marvin Leo, Veasna Sok, Sarun Truck Ngeth and John Phet – were convicted and sentenced.

References

External links

1998 murders in the United States
Attacks on restaurants in North America
Massacres in 1998
Murder in Washington (state)
1998 in Seattle
History of Tacoma, Washington
1998 mass shootings in the United States
Mass shootings in the United States
Crimes in Washington (state)
Deaths by firearm in Washington (state)
Attacks in the United States in 1998
July 1998 events in the United States
July 1998 crimes
Mass shootings in Washington (state)
Attacks on buildings and structures in the United States